Andrea Willi (born 25 May 1955) is a politician from Liechtenstein, first woman to hold the office of Minister of Foreign Affairs, in the government of Prime Minister Mario Frick, between 15 December 1993 and 5 April 2001. She is member of Patriotic Union. Willi earned a PhD in Philosophy at the University of Zurich.

She was born in Balzers and was also the Ambassador to the United Nations Office at Geneva since 1991 until 1993.

References 

1955 births
Living people
Female foreign ministers
Liechtenstein diplomats
Foreign ministers of Liechtenstein
21st-century women politicians
Women government ministers of Liechtenstein
Patriotic Union (Liechtenstein) politicians
Liechtenstein women diplomats
20th-century Liechtenstein politicians
20th-century Liechtenstein women
21st-century Liechtenstein politicians
21st-century Liechtenstein women
University of Zurich alumni